Paris has hosted several Olympiads: 1900 and 1924 and will host in 2024. Paris will be the second city, in the Modern Games, to have hosted three Olympiads when Paris hosts the 2024 Summer Olympics, the other being London (1908, 1948, 2012). Los Angeles will be the third in 2028 (1932, 1984, 2028). 

The French National Olympic and Sports Committee oversees France's interests in the Olympics.

1900 Summer Olympics 

The 1900 Summer Olympics (the Games of the II Olympiad) were the third modern Olympics and the inaugural hosted outside of Athens, Greece. The International Olympic Committee considers them the second Olympics, discounting the intercalated 1906 Summer Olympics. The 1900 Summer Olympics were held simultaneously with the 1900 World's Fair. The events took place between 14 May 1900 and 28 October 1900, with 28 nations participating in 95 events. The French team topped the unofficial medal count, finishing with three times as many medals as the second-place United States, while fielding ten times as many athletes.

1924 Summer Olympics 

The 1924 Summer Olympics (the Games of the VIII Olympiad) were the second to be held after World War I. Showing a collective unity after the war, 44 nations competed in 126 different events between 4 May 1924 and 27 July 1924. Germany was not invited to the games due to security reasons. Unlike the previous time France hosted the Olympics, the French athletes did not have a high medal count, finishing 3rd in the unofficial medal count with only 28 medals.

2024 Summer Olympics 

The 2024 Summer Olympics (the Games of the XXXIII Olympiad) will take place from 27 July 2024 to 12 August 2024. The Paris 2024 Olympic bid was announced as the winner of the bidding process on 13 September 2017, following unsuccessful bid attempts for previous Olympiads. This will be the third time Paris hosts the olympics.

2024 Summer Paralympics 

The 2024 Summer Paralympics will be the seventeenth Paralympics and will take place between 28 August 2024 and 8 September 2024 following the Summer Olympics and will be also played at the same venues in Paris.

External links 
 Paris 2024 Olympic Games official website